Cuba competed at the 2022 World Aquatics Championships in Budapest, Hungary from 18 June to 3 July.

Artistic swimming 

Cuba entered 4 artistic swimmers.

Women

Mixed

Diving

Colombia entered 5 divers.

Men

Women

Mixed

Swimming

Colombia  entered 4 swimmers.
Men

Women

References

Nations at the 2022 World Aquatics Championships
2022
World Aquatics Championships